Cécile Irène Gelabale, formerly Baroness Cécile de Massy, (born 1968) is a French-Monegasque socialite and philanthropist. She serves as the president of Ladies Lunch Monte-Carlo and as vice president of the Monegasque Federation of Contact Sports and Associated Disciplines. She is an ex-wife of Baron Christian Louis de Massy who is a member of the House of Grimaldi. Throughout her Marriage she was known as Baroness Cecile de Massy but upon divorce was required to give up the title and retain her maiden name.

Biography 
Gelabale  was born in 1968 in Guadeloupe, an overseas region of France in the Caribbean, to Denis Gelabale and Lucie Darius Denon.

Gelabale is the fourth ex-wife of Baron Christian Louis de Massy, the son of Princess Antoinette, Baroness of Massy. She gave birth to a son, Antoine de Massy, on 15 January 1997. She also has a son from a previous relationship who was legally adopted by Baron de Massy, Brice Souleyman Gelabale-de Massy, born in Abymes (b. 2 November 1987).

After a six-year separation, She and Christian made their divorce final in 2015. Gelabale started going by her maiden name even before the divorce was finalized. She, however, continued to be referred to as Baroness Cecile de Massy and wife of Baron Christian de Massy in some publications well after her divorce.

In 2005 Gelabale founded Ladies Lunch Monte-Carlo, a charitable organization focused on improving the quality of life for children and adolescents in Monaco. She currently serves as the organization's president. She also serves as an honorary committee member and Vice President of the Monegasque Federation of Contact Sports and Associated Disciplines and the International Academy of Self-Defense and Combat Sports of Monaco. In 2013 she co-directed the first Monte Carlo Fighting Masters, sponsored by the International Academy.

References 

Living people
1968 births
French baronesses
French socialites
Guadeloupean sportswomen
French sports executives and administrators
French emigrants to Monaco
Monegasque philanthropists
Monegasque women
House of Grimaldi
Princesses by marriage